St. Eusebia may refer to:

 Saint Xenia the Righteous of Rome, a 5th-century saint with the baptismal name Eusebia
 Saint Eusebia of Hamay, a 7th-century abbess of the Abbey of Hamay-sur-la-Scarpe, in the diocese of Arras in (Frankish) Hainaut, Francia
 Eusebia Palomino Yenes (1899—1935), Spanish nun of the Salesian Sisters of Don Bosco, beatified by the Catholic church in 2004

See also
 Eusebia (disambiguation)
 Chronological list of saints in the 7th century
 Chronological list of saints and blesseds in the 20th century